Mikhail Mikhaylovich Azarenko (born 15 September 1991) is a Russian sport shooter.

He participated at the 2018 ISSF World Shooting Championships, winning a medal.

References

External links

Living people
1991 births
Russian male sport shooters
Running target shooters